Bene Lario is a comune (municipality) in the Province of Como in the Italian region Lombardy, located about  north of Milan and about  northeast of Como.

Bene Lario borders the following municipalities: Carlazzo, Grandola ed Uniti, Lenno, Porlezza.

Demographic evolution

References

Cities and towns in Lombardy